The Constellation class is a class of multi-mission guided-missile frigates under development for the United States Navy as a follow-on to the modular littoral combat ship. The U.S. Navy announced the FFG(X) frigate project in the United States Department of Defense Request For Information (RFI) on 10 July 2017. 

The U.S. Navy selected five shipbuilders to evolve their designs into a prospective design for the proposed twenty FFG(X) guided-missile frigates. On 30 April 2020, it was announced that Fincantieri Marinette Marine had won the contract with its FREMM multipurpose frigate-based design. The project was later renamed FFG-62 program after the lead ship was named.

Development 
The U.S. Navy procured the first FFG 62 in FY2020, the next was awarded in April 2021, and the third is planned to be awarded is FY22. The U.S. Navy's proposed FY2020 budget request was $1.281 billion for the procurement of the first FFG 62. The U.S. Navy's FY2020 budget submission shows that subsequent ships in the class are estimated by the Navy to cost $850 to $950 million each in then-year dollars.

Design

The U.S. Navy's intention to buy the first FFG(X) in 2020 did not allow enough time to develop a completely new design for the platform. Consequently, the U.S. Navy intended for the design of the FFG(X) to be a modified version of an existing "parent" ship design. The RFI says, "A competition for FFG(X) is envisioned to consider existing parent designs for a Small Surface Combatant that can be modified to accommodate the specific capability requirements prescribed by the U.S. Navy."

The U.S. Navy wanted a frigate that could keep up with the aircraft carriers and have sensors networked in with the rest of the fleet to expand the overall tactical picture available to the group. "The FFG(X) will normally aggregate into strike groups and Large Surface Combatant led surface action groups but also possess the ability to robustly defend itself during conduct of independent operations while connected and contributing to the fleet tactical grid."

In January 2019, the U.S. Navy announced that the new frigate will have a minimum of 32 Mark 41 Vertical Launch System cells aboard the ship for primarily anti-air warfare for self-defense or escort missions.

The U.S. Navy would like for the ship to be able to:
 Destroy surface ships over the horizon,
 Detect enemy submarines,
 Defend convoy ships,
 Employ active and passive electronic warfare systems,
 Defend against swarming small boat attacks.
The class will use a Combined Diesel Electric and Gas Hull, Mechanical and Electrical (HM&E) propulsion system which has never been used in any other U.S. Navy ship. The new propulsion system will be required to be tested on land, in order to reduce the risk of engine failure, which has plagued the previous LCS program.

Contenders 
Six shipbuilders submitted proposals for conceptual designs to the U.S. Navy FFG(X) Frigate program. On 16 February 2018, the U.S. Navy announced that from these proposals they had selected five shipbuilders and awarded them each $15 million contracts to produce conceptual designs for the FFG(X). These shipbuilders were Austal USA, Fincantieri Marine Group, General Dynamics, Huntington Ingalls Industries, and Lockheed Martin. 

Atlas North America submitted the MEKO A-200 but was not selected for a conceptual design contract. Ship designs from these five shipbuilders were evaluated by the U.S. Navy to inform the final specifications that would be used for the FFG(X) request for proposal in 2019 and the intended contract award in 2020.

On 28 May 2019, Lockheed Martin withdrew from the competition.

Contract award 
On 30 April 2020, it was announced that Fincantieri Marinette Marine's FREMM multipurpose frigate had won the contest and was awarded a $795 million contract for detailed design and construction of the lead ship, with options for nine additional ships. On 20 May 2021, the U.S. Navy issued Fincantieri Marinette Marine a $554 million contract to start building the future .

Ships of the class 

In June 2021, the Navy announced that Naval Station Everett in Washington would be the future home of the first 12 ships of the class.

Naming 
On 8 April 2020, it was revealed that four proposed names were put forward by outgoing acting Secretary of the Navy, Thomas Modly. He expressed a desire for the first ship to be named Agility with the class designated Agility class. Other names put forward were Intrepid, Endeavor, and Dauntless. However, Navy leaders said Modly's proposed names would not be adopted. In July 2020, it was reported by The Drive that the lead ship would be named USS Brooke (FFG-80). Later the U.S. Navy clarified via Twitter that reports about reusing the USS Brooke name for a new warship were erroneous. 

On 7 October 2020, Navy Secretary Kenneth Braithwaite announced the first FFG(X) frigate would be named USS Constellation (FFG-62). On 2 December 2020, Secretary Braithwaite announced that the second ship of the class will be named USS Congress (FFG-63). On 15 January 2021, Secretary Braithwaite announced that the third ship of the class will be named USS Chesapeake (FFG-64). All three ships are named after three of the U.S. Navy's original six frigates. 

United States ship naming conventions have historically named frigates after U.S. Navy and Marine Corps heroes or leaders. A report to Congress on 4 February 2021 advised that the U.S. Navy had not stated that this naming scheme was a change in their rules for naming ships.

References

External links
 RFI Solicitation Number: N0002418R2300 - 2017-07-10; response by 24 August 2017

Proposed ships of the United States Navy
Frigates and destroyer escorts of the United States Navy
FREMM multipurpose frigates